Scopula unisignata is a moth of the  family Geometridae. It is found in Birma.

References

Moths described in 1926
unisignata
Moths of Asia